Tavaux is a commune in the Jura department in the Bourgogne-Franche-Comté region in eastern France. Dole – Jura Airport is located here.

Population

See also
Communes of the Jura department

References

Communes of Jura (department)